The John Van Buren Wicoff House is a historic building located at 641 Plainsboro Road in the township of Plainsboro in Middlesex County, New Jersey. It was added to the National Register of Historic Places on September 12, 1979, for its significance in politics/government from 1907 to 1947. It is currently a historic house museum, known as the Historic Wicoff House Museum.

History and description
In 1872, Catharine Lucretia Britton acquired  here following her father's death. On February 3, 1875, she married John Wicoff and moved here. The house likely dates to this time. On June 8, 1878, their only child, John Van Buren (J.V.B.) Wicoff was born. He graduated from Princeton University in 1900 and became a locally prominent attorney, politician, banker, and farmer. He lived in the house until his death in 1952. It was purchased by Township of Plainsboro in 1977 for use as a municipal center. Starting in 1995, the Plainsboro Historical Society operated a museum in the house.

The house is a two story frame building featuring Italianate style. Elements of Classical Revival style were added in 1929 when the house was expanded and altered.

See also
 National Register of Historic Places listings in Middlesex County, New Jersey
 List of museums in New Jersey

References

Plainsboro Township, New Jersey	
National Register of Historic Places in Middlesex County, New Jersey
Houses on the National Register of Historic Places in New Jersey
Houses in Middlesex County, New Jersey
Italianate architecture in New Jersey
Historic house museums in New Jersey
New Jersey Register of Historic Places